Filodrillia pergradata is a species of sea snail, a marine gastropod mollusk in the family Borsoniidae.

Description

Distribution
This marine species is endemic to Australia and occurs off Southern Australia.

References

 Cotton, Bernard C. Australian Recent and Tertiary Turridae. Field Naturalists Section of the Royal Society of South Australia, Conchology Club, 1947.

pergradata
Gastropods of Australia
Gastropods described in 1947